Percival Arland Ussher (9 September 1899 – 24 December 1980) was an Anglo-Irish academic, essayist and translator.

Ussher was born in Battersea, London, the only child of Emily Jebb (born at the Lyth estate, Ellesmere, Shropshire in 1872) and Irishman Beverley Grant Ussher. The Jebbs were a wealthy and influential family of reformers. His grandmother Eglantyne Louisa Jebb founded the Home Arts and Industries Association, his aunt Eglantyne Jebb founded the Save the Children organisation, and his aunt Dorothy Jebb Buxton was a humanitarian.

Beverley Ussher worked for the Board of Education in England as an Inspector of Schools. They lived in England until his retirement in 1914, at which time they moved to Ireland and lived at Cappagh House in Dungarvan, County Waterford. Emily Ussher was also an activist and tried to raise the alarm about the atrocities the Black and Tans were committing against the Irish.

Ussher studied at Cambridge University for some time. In 1926, he published a translation of The Midnight Court (Cúirt an Mheán-Oíche) by the Irish Gaelic-language poet, Brian Merriman. Ussher published The Face and Mind of Ireland (1949) and Three Great Irishmen (1952), a comparative study of Shaw, Yeats, and Joyce. Ussher moved to County Waterford to manage the family farm before moving to Dublin in 1953.

References

External links
Emory University literature collection
Genealogy
Arland Ussher Correspondence, 1921-1959 at Southern Illinois University Carbondale, Special Collections Research Center

1899 births
1980 deaths
20th-century Irish people
20th-century Anglo-Irish people
Irish essayists
English translators
English essayists
People from Battersea
Translators from Irish
Translators of Brian Merriman
20th-century British translators
20th-century essayists